Asura simplifascia is a moth of the family Erebidae. It is found in India.

References

simplifascia
Moths described in 1890
Moths of Asia